The Bulgarian National Awakening is the initial period of the Bulgarian National Revival in the history of Bulgaria, from the Treaty of Karlowitz to the Ottoman coups of 1807–08.  During this historical period of enlightenment (The Age of Enlightenment), the interest in self-identification and self-knowledge was aroused and revived in the conditions of the gradual decline of the Ottoman Empire, especially after the Treaty of Küçük Kaynarca.

Background 
Ottoman Bulgaria, administratively formed as Rumelia Eyalet, is the foundation on which the Ottoman Empire stepped for its establishment, consolidation and conquest in Europe until the two battles of Vienna (Siege of Vienna and Battle of Vienna). Previously, the two battles at Mohács marked the beginning and end of the Ottoman presence in Central Europe. 

The period of the 16th and 17th centuries until the Great Turkish War were a time of all-round prosperity without wars in the Bulgarian lands. The Franco-Ottoman alliance ensured the status quo in Europe and determined the new age and classicism, including Ancien Régime politically.

Beginning of the awakening 
The loss of Ottoman Hungary was a crushing blow to the Ottoman Empire. The Treaty of Constantinople (1700) established diplomatic relations of the Ottoman Empire with the Tsardom of Russia, which after the period of Government reform of Peter the Great rose to the Russian Empire (1721). The Kingdom of Prussia appeared on the political map of Europe, with which the Ottoman Empire established diplomatic relations in 1761 during the Seven Years' War.

After the end of the Köprülü era, the Bulgarian lands and the Bulgarians found themselves after two centuries of tranquility of Pax Ottomana again on Via Militaris, as during the first three crusades during the time of Byzantine Bulgaria. This circumstance in the context of Age of Enlightenment marks the beginning of the awakening of the Bulgarians. In Ottoman historiography, this time is called the Tulip period. French diplomacy in the person of Louis Sauveur Villeneuve managed with the Treaty of Belgrade and Treaty of Niš (1739) to stabilize its key ally since the time of Suleiman the Magnificent, but the glory of the sword of Osman has passed with the seventeenth century. 

It was at this time that two key works appeared, marking the overall socio-economic and cultural-spiritual changes in the Bulgarian lands and in the life and spirit of the Bulgarians — Stemmatografia by Hristofor Žefarović and Istoriya Slavyanobolgarskaya.  The beginning of the revival was marked by the enlightenment of Maxim Suvorov, and the beginning of the end of the revival was marked by the coup as a result of which Catherine the Great became Empress and which coup was followed on Ottoman territory by the liquidation of the centuries-old spiritual institutes of the Patriarchate of Peć and Archbishopric of Ohrid.

Key events and personalities 

The Russo-Turkish War (1768–1774) catalyzed the process of Bulgarian National Awakening to massification, as a result of which the so-called Kirdzhalis appeared, to which Pushkin dedicated his work of the same name (Kirdzhali). The most prominent leaders are Osman Pazvantoğlu and Ali Pasha of Ioannina. The Nizam-I Cedid is a kind of denial of the entire history of the Ottoman Empire and an emanation of the Bulgarian National Awakening.

Sequel 
In the 19th century, as a result of the Greek Plan and the Eastern Question, the Liberation of Bulgaria was realized.

See also
National awakening of Bulgaria
Bulgarian Land Army (1810-1812)
Bulgarian Exarchate
April Uprising of 1876
Constantinople Conference
Treaty of San Stefano
Congress of Berlin
Kresna–Razlog uprising
Bulgarian unification
Ilinden-Preobrazhenie Uprising
Bulgarian Declaration of Independence
Greater Bulgaria
Time of Parting (novel)
Golden Age of medieval Bulgarian culture
Greek National Awakening

Notes

Bulgarian National Awakening